Events from the year 1985 in Sweden

Incumbents
 Monarch – Carl XVI Gustaf
 Prime Minister – Olof Palme

Events
28 March to 7 April – The 1985 World Table Tennis Championships were held in Gothenburg
23 August to 1 September – The 1985 World Weightlifting Championships were held in Södertälje
15 September – Swedish general election. Olof Palme remains Prime Minister of Sweden following a victory for the Social Democrats.

Births

14 March – Jessica Samuelsson, heptathlete
27 March – Caroline Winberg, model
18 May – Johan Eurén, wrestler
30 May – Erik Rost, ski orienteer
10 June – Kristina Lundberg, ice hockey player
26 June – Bobo Sollander, footballer
27 June – Patrik Fahlgren, handball player
27 June – Stina Viktorsson, curler
6 July – Niklas Edin, curler
28 August – Helena Jansson, orienteer
6 September – Elias Granath, ice hockey player
17 September – Jimmy Jansson, singer and songwriter
11 October – Gabriella Fagundez, swimmer
25 November – Marcus Hellner, cross-country skier

Deaths
27 August – John Albrechtson, sailor, World champion and Olympic champion (born 1936).
3 October – Yngve Stoor, singer and composer (born 1912)

See also
 1985 in Swedish television

References

 
Sweden
Years of the 20th century in Sweden